The 1918–19 Colgate Raiders men's basketball team represented Colgate University during the 1918–19 college men's basketball season. The head coach was Walt Hammond, coaching the Raiders in his sixth season. The team had finished with an overall record of 13–6. The team captain was John Cotterell.

Schedule

|-

References

Colgate Raiders men's basketball seasons
Colgate
Colgate
Colgate